Buku Ende is a book of hymns in the Batak language used in the Batak Christian Protestant Church in Indonesia. The book is organized and published by the printing division of Batak Christian Protestant Church in Pematang Siantar, Indonesia. The number of songs in this book are 556 songs. In the new edition, Buku Ende has been completed with 308 additional songs (BE-557 up to BE-864), and it is called as Book Ende Sangap Di Jahowa (SDJ).

External links
 Huria Kristen Batak Protestan
 Buku Ende HKBP Android Application

Batak languages
Hymnals
Protestantism in Indonesia